Jenna Lee Dewan (born December 3, 1980) is an American actress and dancer. She started her career as a backup dancer for Janet Jackson, and later worked with artists including Christina Aguilera, Pink, and Missy Elliott. She is known for her role as Nora Clark in the 2006 film Step Up. She has also starred on the short-lived NBC series The Playboy Club and had a recurring role on the FX series American Horror Story: Asylum. She portrayed Freya Beauchamp on the Lifetime series Witches of East End, Lucy Lane in The CW series Supergirl and Superman & Lois and Joanna in Soundtrack on Netflix. Dewan has hosted the reality television shows World of Dance and Flirty Dancing and served as a judge on Come Dance with Me. She currently stars as Bailey Nune on ABC's The Rookie. She also had a recurring role on the FOX medical drama The Resident.

Early life
Dewan was born December 3, 1980 in Hartford, Connecticut, the daughter of Nancy Smith (née Bursch) and Darryll Dewan, who was a running back on the 1972 Notre Dame football team. Her father is of Lebanese and Polish descent and her mother is of German and English ancestry.

As a child, Dewan moved frequently; she mentioned in an interview that she lived in seven cities before reaching the seventh grade. While attending high school at Notre Dame Preparatory School in Towson, Maryland, Dewan was a varsity cheerleader. She transferred to Grapevine High School in Grapevine, Texas. She was also a varsity cheerleader there and was voted prom queen during her senior year. She went to University of Southern California and was a member of the California Gamma chapter of Pi Beta Phi.

Career

Dancing

Dewan first appeared in Janet Jackson's "Doesn't Really Matter" video in 2000 and later in "All for You" and the All for You Tour in 2001. She credits working with Jackson for aiding her career, allowing her to later work with many other artists and giving her the experience necessary to co-star in the dance film Step Up. In 2016, Dewan modeled as the face of dancewear manufacturer Danskin in a campaign and photo shoot that captured and featured her athleticism as a dancer.

Acting
In 2006, Dewan co-starred with Channing Tatum in Step Up, as well as starring in Take the Lead that same year.

In August 2008, Dewan starred in the Lifetime made-for-television film Fab Five: The Texas Cheerleader Scandal which follows five rule-breaking teens. She portrayed the role of disciplinarian Coach Emma Carr. In November 2009, she appeared in the straight-to-DVD comedy American Virgin alongside Rob Schneider.

In March 2011, Dewan was cast in the NBC pilot of The Playboy Club. In May 2011, NBC picked up the series for a full season. She portrayed the role of Bunny Janie, a provocative Playboy bunny who works at a Playboy Club in Chicago in 1961. The series premiered on September 19 to 5.2 million viewers with mixed reviews from critics. Due to low ratings, NBC cancelled the series after just three episodes in October 2011.

In November 2011, Dewan starred in the film The Jerk Theory. This was first released in Germany in 2009. It was later released in the United States in November 2011.

Dewan appeared in the romantic-comedy film 10 Years, alongside her then-husband Channing Tatum, who also co-produced. The film was released on September 14, 2012. That same year, she appeared as Teresa Morrison in American Horror Story: Asylum, the second season of the horror television series.

In 2013, Dewan began starring in the Lifetime series Witches of East End as Freya Beauchamp, one of the lead characters. In late 2015, she began a recurring role in the CBS/CW series Supergirl as Lucy Lane, and reprised the role in its spinoff Superman & Lois. She also had a recurring role in FOX's The Resident. Dewan's upcoming projects include The Wedding Year, Berlin, I Love You and Soundtrack.

She joined the cast of ABC's The Rookie as Bailey in its third season, and was promoted to series regular in its fourth season.

In 2018, Dewan makes an appearance on the television series Seatbelt Psychic and receives a spooky reading from the famous medium Thomas John.

In 2022, Dewan starred and executive produced in the Lifetime film Let's Get Physical as part of the it's "Ripped from the Headlines" feature film. She portrays Sadie Smith who is loosely based on Zumba instructor Alexis Wright with the film inspired by Alexis' and her side prostitution gig.

33andOut Productions
Along with friends Reid Carolin, Adam Martingano, Brett Rodriguez and Channing Tatum, Dewan started a production company called 33andOut Productions. Their first production is a documentary called Earth Made of Glass that follows Rwandan President Paul Kagame and genocide survivor Jean-Pierre Sagahutu. It premiered at the 2010 Tribeca Film Festival. Dewan and Tatum collaborated in a YouTube Premium/Starz television series Step Up, where they executive produced together.

Personal life
In 2006, Dewan started dating actor Channing Tatum after meeting on the set of their film Step Up. They married on July 11, 2009, in Malibu, California. They have one daughter, born in 2013. On April 2, 2018, the couple announced that they were separating. Six months later, Dewan filed for divorce from Tatum. Their divorce was finalized in November 2019.

In October 2018, it was confirmed that Dewan was in a relationship with actor Steve Kazee. In February 2020, she and Kazee announced their engagement.  They have one son, born in 2020.

Dewan is an animal rights activist and a vegan. PETA declared her to be one of three "Sexiest Vegans" of 2017.

Filmography

Film

Television

Producer

Music videos

Awards and nominations

References

External links

 
 
 

1980 births
Living people
21st-century American actresses
American documentary film producers
American female dancers
American film actresses
Film producers from Texas
American people of English descent
American people of German descent
American people of Lebanese descent
American people of Polish descent
American people of Syrian descent
American television actresses
American women in business
Actresses from Hartford, Connecticut
Actresses from Texas
Dancers from Texas
People from Grapevine, Texas
University of Southern California alumni
Film producers from Connecticut
American women documentary filmmakers